Metasia octogenalis is a species of moth in the family Crambidae. It is found in Syria, Iran and Turkey.

References

Moths described in 1863
Metasia